5th Panzer Army was the name of two different German armoured formations during World War II. The first of these was formed in 1942, during the North African campaign and surrendered to the Allies at Tunis in 1943. The army was re-formed in France in 1944, fought in Western Europe and surrendered in the Ruhr pocket in 1945.

History

Formation in Italy and deployment in North Africa
On 17 November 1942, the Stab Nehring staff, assigned to the German general in Rome, was reformed to become the LXXXX Army Corps. This staff was soon repurposed to become the 5th Panzer Army.

The 5th Panzer Army was created on 8 December 1942 as a command formation for armoured units forming to defend Tunisia against Allied attacks which threatened, after the success of the Allied Operation Torch landings in Algeria and Morocco. The army fought alongside the Italian First Army as a part of Army Group Afrika. The army capitulated on 13 May 1943, along with its commander Gustav von Vaerst. The army was disbanded on 30 June 1943.

Normandy
The army was reformed on 24 January 1944 as Panzer Group West, the armoured reserve for OB West. The new army was placed under the command of Leo Geyr von Schweppenburg. The method of employment of Panzer Group West in the event of an allied invasion was the subject of much controversy, with OB West commander Gerd von Rundstedt and Army Group B commander Erwin Rommel favouring different methods. Rundstedt and Geyr von Schweppenburg believed that the panzer group should be held in reserve some distance from the front, to counter-attack Allied penetrations. Rommel was convinced that Allied air power and naval artillery would not allow the Germans the freedom to move large formations and so insisted that the panzers should be deployed much closer to the front line. Adolf Hitler forced an unhappy compromise on the western commanders and refused to allow them to commit the panzer group without his authority. When the Allied Invasion began on 6 June 1944, Panzer Group West remained immobile; by 8 June, Geyr had been able to rush three panzer divisions northward to defend Caen against British and Canadian forces. Geyr planned to launch the divisions in a counter-attack that would drive the British and Canadians back into the sea. On 10 June, Schweppenburg was wounded in an attack on the Panzer Group West headquarters at La Caine. Geyr's tank units managed to limit the British advance for another month but he was relieved of his command on 2 July, after seconding Rundstedt's request that Hitler authorize a strategic withdrawal from Caen. On 2 July he was replaced by Heinrich Eberbach. The panzer group fought against the Allied forces in Normandy, suffering heavy losses and eventually finding many of its divisions trapped in the Falaise Pocket. After the shattered remnants of the panzer group escaped from Falaise, it began a retreat towards the German border.

Retreat, Ardennes
In August, the remaining elements of Panzer Group West were reorganized as the 5th Panzer Army, with a combat formation remaining in action under the title Panzer Group Eberbach. After a brief period under Sepp Dietrich, command of the army passed to Hasso von Manteuffel. The army saw heavy combat on the German border against Allied forces, the panzer divisions suffering heavily from Allied ground attack aircraft. In November the 5th Panzer Army began forming up in the Ardennes, alongside the newly formed 6th SS Panzer Army under Dietrich. Both formations took part in the Battle of the Bulge, the Fifth Panzer Army became the main central force advancing westwards from the pre-existing front lines after the planned schwerpunkt assigned to the Sixth Panzer Army was stopped at the Elsenborn Ridge and the Ambleve Valley.  The Fifth Panzer Army suffered heavy losses in battles around Bastogne and in the armor battles around Celles and Dinant, the westernmost points of advance. After the offensive was cancelled, it continued its fighting withdrawal to the German border. In March, it was involved in efforts to eliminate the American bridgehead over the Rhine at the Ludendorff Bridge in Remagen. The 5th Panzer Army was encircled and trapped in the Ruhr Pocket, and surrendered on 17 April 1945.

Commanders

Fifth Panzer Army (North Africa)

Panzer Group West

Panzer Group Eberbach

Fifth Panzer Army (France)

Order of battle (North Africa)
As of April 1943.
Manteuffel Group 
334th Infantry Division 
999th Light Division
Hermann Goering Division
10th Panzer Division  
Italian  Superga Infantry Division

Footnotes

Bibliography

 
 

A
P5
PGWest
Military units and formations established in 1942
Military units and formations disestablished in 1945